Snowboarding at the 2013 European Youth Olympic Winter Festival is held at the Clăbucet Sosire (Arrival) slope in Predeal, Romania from 19 to 22 February 2013.

Results

Medal table

Men's events

Women's events

References

External links
Results
All Clăbucet slopes | Photo Gallery
EYOWF 2013 - Presentation Video at YouTube
EYOWF 2013 - Facilities Presentation at YouTube

2013 in snowboarding
2013 European Youth Olympic Winter Festival events
2013